The Diocese of Lindi may refer to either of two Roman Catholic Dioceses in Tanzania:

 The Roman Catholic Diocese of Lindi, created on October 17, 1986
 The Roman Catholic Archdiocese of Songea, known as the Diocese of Lindi from December 15, 1927, until December 23, 1931